The 1976 Auburn Tigers football team represented Auburn University in the 1976 NCAA Division I football season.  At the end of the 1975 season, Ralph "Shug" Jordan retired after 25 years as head coach of the Auburn Tigers.  Doug Barfield, Jordan's offensive coordinator, took over as head coach starting in 1976.  He coached the Tigers to a 3–8 record his first season, winning just 2 of 6 conference games.  However, Mississippi State was forced to forfeit their game that year, so Auburn's record officially improved to 4–7 (3–3).'''

Schedule

References

Auburn
Auburn Tigers football seasons
Auburn Tigers football